John Francis Lickerish, known professionally as Francis Lickerish (born 11 April 1954, in Cambridge), is a British composer, guitarist and lutenist, and founder member of British art-rock band The Enid.

Lickerish was a member of The Enid from its creation in 1974 until 1980, and appears on their first four studio albums and the two 'Live at Hammersmith' albums. He is an alumnus of Finchden Manor, as are fellow Enid founders Robert John Godfrey and Stephen Stewart.

Lickerish appears uncredited as the session bass guitarist on the Kim Wilde song "Kids in America".

After leaving The Enid he graduated from Sheffield Hallam University, later pursuing a career in counselling, and is a respected professional in the fields of adult addiction and family services, working at Clouds House, The Priory and Capio Nightingale Hospital.

After a 20-year absence from the music industry, he formed a new band Secret Green, in 2006, who released their first album 'To Wake The King' in May 2009.

Lickerish is married with three children and lives in Dorset, England.

Work with The Enid

Francis Lickerish's skill as a musician is second only to his skill as a storyteller. A much awaited feature of concerts given by The Enid was his storytelling. He would sit, often cross-legged, on stage and narrate a long "shaggy dog" style story while the roadies changed instruments or re-arranged the stage for the next set. Having their roots in traditional tales, the stories were novel time-fillers which would captivate an audience of thousands and entertain them while otherwise boring technical work was going on. A favourite of Enid fans was the story of The Archangel Barry. This was the introduction to "Albion Fair" in which an angel exhorted the band to write music with "more notes in it".

His magnum opus however was the story of Fand. This ancient myth was amalgamated with the legends of King Arthur to create an epic and magical tale that was at once fresh and rooted in tradition.

Discography

Studio albums
The Enid - In the Region of the Summer Stars (1976) (BUK BULP 2014)
The Enid - Aerie Faerie Nonsense (1977) (EMI International INS 3012)
The Enid - Touch Me (1978) (Pye NSPH 18593)
The Enid - Six Pieces (1979) (Pye NH 116)
Secret Green - To Wake The King (2009) (Holyground HG137)
Francis Lickerish - Far and Forgot - From the Lost Lands (2012) (self-released SG101)

Live albums
The Enid - Live at Hammersmith (Vol 1) (Recorded 1979) (1984) (ENID 1)
The Enid - Live at Hammersmith (Vol 2) (Recorded 1979) (1984) (ENID 2)

References

Sources
Official website of Francis Lickerish
Capio House
Forgotten Sons - A History of The Enid
Discography

1955 births
Living people
People from Cambridge
Alumni of Sheffield Hallam University
The Enid members
Secret Green members